The Strakonice Bagpiper is a 1955 Czechoslovak drama film directed by Karel Steklý.

Cast
 Jana Andrsová
 Josef Bek
 Vlasta Fabianová as Nymph Rosava
 Květa Fialová
 Josef Hlinomaz as Mikuli
 Rudolf Hrušínský
 Stanislav Langer
 Marie Tomášová
 Vítězslav Vejražka

References

External links
 

1955 films
1955 drama films
Czech drama films
Czechoslovak drama films
1950s Czech-language films
Czech black-and-white films
Czechoslovak black-and-white films
Films directed by Karel Steklý
1950s Czech films